List of topics in space; topics as related to outer space.

Accidents in space
 Animals in space 
 Architecture in space
 Batteries in space
 Christmas in space
 Corrosion in space
 Death in space
 Dogs in space
 Dust in space
 Economy in space (Mining in space)
 Garbage in space
 Humans in space
 Hygiene in space
 Industry in space
 Locomotion in space
 Medicine in space
 Mice in space
 Microorganisms tested in outer space
 Monkeys and apes in space
 Music in space
 Nuclear power in space
 Neuroscience in space
 Plants in space
 Religion in space
 Sex in space
 Solar power in space
Solar power in space for Earth
 Telescopes in space
 Tourism in space
 War in space
 Weapons in space
 Weather in space
 Women in space
 Writing in space

See also
 Space-based radar
 Space-based solar power
 Space and survival
 Space science
 Space station
 Space technology

 Topics
Science-related lists
Space